City of the Rats is the third novel in the eight-volume fantasy series Deltora Quest, written by Australian author Emily Rodda. The novel was first published by Scholastic in 2000, and later released in the United States in 2001. The novel continues Lief, Barda, and Jasmines journey to find the seven missing gems of Deltora, braving dangers and guardians in each book.

Plot summary
Lief, Barda, and Jasmine leave the Lake of Tears after they have retrieved the Ruby. They are now searching for the opal, which is located in Hira, or the City of the Rats. While traveling, they find signs which all have the word "Tom" written on it. They then find themselves in a trap that Thaegan's remaining eleven children had prepared. With the help of Filli, the three managed to kill all the children except for one, Ichabod, and continue on their quest.

They find and enter Tom's shop and buy useful provisions such as Fire Beads, Water Eaters, Glowing Bubbles, and Instant Bread. They also bought three animals called Muddlets. Muddlets had three legs and can be ridden much like a horse. Despite Tom's directions, Lief didn't listen to him and went the wrong way. The three lost control of the Muddlets as they ran on their own. Lief, Barda, and Jasmine followed the Muddlets home, to the city of Noradz and become trapped. Noradz has customs that keep the city vigorously clean. When Filli comes out of hiding from Jasmine's shirt, a Ra-Kacharz mistakes it for a rat and gives the trio two choices, to live or to die. Lief was commanded to pick a card labeled either Life or Death out of a cup. Realizing that both cards say Death, Lief tricks the Ra-Kacharz and the trio are thrown into prison. A girl named Tira managed to free them and shows them the secret way out, by passing through the kitchen trash tube. They survive the dangers of the tube by wearing the Ra-Kacharz clothes that they stole and finally reached the Broad River. Using the Water Eaters, Lief, Barda, and Jasmine crossed the river, only to find that there were rats waiting for them. They managed to escape the deadly rats using the explosive Fire Beads and enter the city's center. The Glowing Bubbles come into use and lights their way as they move through the dark. There, Lief starts to hear voices, which was revealed to be of Reeah's, a huge snake called the King of Rats. The crown atop of Reeah's head housed the opal. Lief realized that the past inhabitants of the City of the Rats were the people of Noradz. He also realized that "Noradz" was a homophone of "No Rats" and "Ra-Kacharz" was a homophone of "Rat-Catchers". The overrun of rats in their city had caused them to move and take up vigorously clean customs. Also, "Noradzeer", which is repeated very often by the people of Noradz, appears to be a homophone of "No Rats Here". Lief realizes that Reeah had set a trap for them. After a fight, Lief and Jasmine defeat the snake. Lief touches the opal to take it and gets a vision of him sinking into the Shifting Sands. Lief remembers that the opal's vision of the future is not always true, and they continue their quest to seek their fourth gem at the Shifting Sands.

Characters
 Lief: Lief is the main character of the series. Lief was born to parents King Endon and Queen Sharn though he believed them to be Jarred and Anna of the forge. As a child Lief roamed the streets of Del, sharpening his wits and gaining him the skills needed for his future quests. Though he did not know it, he was constantly protected by Barda and he prided himself on his many 'lucky' escapes. On his sixteenth birthday, it is revealed to him that he must begin a dangerous quest to find the lost gems of the Belt of Deltora.
 Barda: Barda was enlisted as a friend by the king and queen of Deltora and was trusted to help him find the lost gems of Deltora sixteen years before the initial story took place. For the next sixteen years, Barda disguised himself as a beggar so as to discover information vital to the quest. He also became the bodyguard of Endon and Sharn's child Lief, albeit without the semi-arrogant Lief's knowledge thereof. Upon Lief's sixteenth birthday Barda revealed himself to Lief and the quest for the gems of Deltora began. Though Barda was at first annoyed to travel encumbered by a child, he soon saw Lief as more of a help than a hindrance.
 Jasmine: Jasmine is a wild girl, described as having wild black hair (dark green hair in the anime) and emerald green eyes who has grown up in the Forests of Silence, where Lief and Barda meet her shortly after leaving Del. Her parents, Jarred and Anna, were captured by Grey Guards when she was seven years old, and so she has been raised by the forest. She can understand the language of the trees and of many animals, and has incredibly sharp senses, but has trouble understanding some social customs. Jasmine is usually seen with her raven, Kree, and a mouse-like creature she calls Filli. Jasmine is like Lief and occasionally has a quick temper. After helping Lief and Barda in the forest and with the help of the topaz, she is greeted by her mother's spirit from beyond the grave, who tells her to go with Lief and Barda in their quest. After this encounter, she joins Lief and Barda in the search for the great gems that will complete the Belt.

See also

 Deltora series
 Deltora Quest 1
 Emily Rodda
 Characters in the Deltora series

References

External links
 USA Deltora website
 Australian Deltora Quest website
 Emily Rodda's official website

2001 Australian novels
2001 fantasy novels
Australian children's novels
Australian fantasy novels
Children's fantasy novels
Deltora
Fictional populated places
2001 children's books